Łutynowo  is a village in the administrative district of Gmina Olsztynek, within Olsztyn County, Warmian-Masurian Voivodeship, in northern Poland.

The village has a population of 280.

References

Villages in Olsztyn County